Liceo Agustín Ross Edwards is a Chilean public (municipal) high school located in Pichilemu, Cardenal Caro Province. It is named after Agustín Ross Edwards, a Chilean politician and known for building the historic centre of the town of Pichilemu.

The high school was created in 1979, and works as a Humanistic Scientific high school. The high school has employed the Complete Scholar Journey since 1998.

The Liceo Agustín Ross Edwards' principal is Hipólito Segundo Solano Rubio. As of 2012, LARE had 562 students, and 38 teachers. The president of the parents' center (centro de padres) is Marco Antonio Salgado Contreras, and the president of the students' center (centro de alumnos) is Matías Lizana Calderón.

References

External links

  

Educational institutions established in 1979
Secondary schools in Chile
Schools in Cardenal Caro Province
Education in Pichilemu
Organizations based in Pichilemu
Buildings and structures in Pichilemu
1979 establishments in Chile